U.S. Route 285 is a north–south United States highway, running 846 miles (1,362 km) through the states of Texas, New Mexico and Colorado. The highway's southern terminus is in Sanderson, Texas at an intersection with U.S. Route 90. US 285 has always had an endpoint in Denver, Colorado, although the original US 285 went north from Denver (that segment is now a part of U.S. Route 287). Today the highway's northern terminus is in Denver, at exit 201 on Interstate 25.

US 285 is a secondary route of US 85, which it crosses in metro Denver, and technically crosses again in Santa Fe, New Mexico (today its parent route is largely concurrent with Interstate 25 through New Mexico, and as a result US 85 is no longer signed in New Mexico). US 285 also intersects a sibling route, US 385, in Fort Stockton, Texas.

Trucking makes up a large portion of the route's traffic, but along much of its route the road is also used for local travel from one town to the next.  The northern section of US 285, from Santa Fe to Denver, traverses mountainous and rocky terrain; with that in mind, anyone using the road should check weather conditions during the winter months.

Route description

|-
|TX
|170
|274
|-
|NM
|412
|663
|-
|CO
|264
|425
|-
|Total
|846
|1362
|}

Texas

The southern terminus of US 285 is at U.S. 90 in Sanderson. Proceeding northward, it crosses I-10 at Fort Stockton, then meets I-20 at Pecos on its way to New Mexico.

New Mexico

As 285 traverses north on the eastern plains of New Mexico, it passes through Carlsbad, Artesia and then Roswell. In Artesia the route intersects with U.S. Route 82.   In Roswell, the route intersects with U.S. Route 70 and U.S. Route 380.  The route next heads northwest to Vaughn where it has a brief concurrency with U.S. Route 54 and U.S. Route 60.  The route then continues northwest and has a junction with Interstate 40 at Clines Corners.

Heading north out of Clines Corners, the route continues towards the state capital.  At the outskirts of Santa Fe, the route becomes concurrent  with I-25, U.S. Route 84, and its unsigned parent (U.S. Route 85) for several miles heading west through the foothills of the Sangre De Cristo Mountains to Santa Fe.  After exiting I-25, US 285 follows Saint Francis Drive through Santa Fe.  The route continues north by northwest to Española and Chamita, where the concurrency with US 84 ends.  The route then traverses the Carson National Forest where 285 now makes a long climb up to the Colorado Plateau, passing through Ojo Caliente as it ascends to the San Luis Valley. After crossing US 64, the highway passes through the village of Tres Piedras, New Mexico at the south end of the valley, then proceeds north to the Colorado border.

Colorado

Heading north from the Colorado border, US 285 passes through the main part of the San Luis Valley, eventually reaching Alamosa.  As the highway heads north, it begins to ascend to the northern end of the valley and eventually climbs over Poncha Pass, elevation , and drops sharply down the other side into the Arkansas River Valley.

The highway brushes Salida and follows the Arkansas River north up the valley, then takes a sharp eastward turn just before the small town of Buena Vista. 285 then climbs over Trout Creek Pass, elevation , and enters the high-altitude South Park basin.

A few miles north, the highway passes through Fairplay and the historic South Park City site, then reaches its highest elevation: , at the summit of Red Hill Pass.  US 285 then leaves the South Park basin and climbs over Kenosha Pass, elevation , and skirts the south side of the Mount Evans massif as it descends its way through the foothills range towards Denver.

As the highway leaves the Rocky Mountains and reaches Denver's southwest suburbs, it becomes Hampden Avenue, an important artery in the Denver metro area, then reaches its northern terminus at I-25.

On March 14, 2008, both houses of the Colorado legislature, in a unanimous vote, named the section between Kenosha Pass and C-470 the Ralph Carr Memorial Highway.

History

The short segment between US 50 at Salida and US 24 at Buena Vista closely parallels the original U.S. Route 650, which was designated in 1926, but eliminated in 1936 when US 285 was commissioned along its present extent from Sanderson to Denver, mostly replacing state-numbered highways.

Between Bailey and Nathrop, south of Buena Vista, Colorado, US 285 mostly follows the route of the Denver, South Park and Pacific Railroad. The highway passes by the historic community of Como, which became in its day, the natural central hub for the Denver South Park & Pacific. This town was the junction point of three main lines run by the railroad: from Denver to Como across Kenosha Pass; from Como to Leadville via Boreas and Fremont Passes; and from Como to Gunnison and beyond via Trout Creek Pass and the famous Alpine Tunnel. At Kenosha Pass in Park County, CO, remains part of a wye used by the railroad to turn around helper locomotives that assisted trains to ascend the steep mountain passes.

Major intersections
Texas
  in Sanderson
  in Fort Stockton. The highways travel concurrently through Fort Stockton.
  in Fort Stockton
  in Pecos
New Mexico
  in Carlsbad. The highways travel concurrently through Carlsbad.
  in Artesia
  in Roswell. US 70/US 285 travels concurrently to north of Roswell.
  southeast of Vaughn. US 54/US 285 travels concurrently to southwest of Vaughn. US 60/US 285 travels concurrently to Encino.
  in Clines Corners
  in Eldorado at Santa Fe. I-25/US 85/US 285 travels concurrently to south of Santa Fe. US 84/US 285 travels concurrently to north-northwest of Hernandez.
  in Tres Piedras
Colorado
  in Alamosa. The highways travel concurrently to Monte Vista.
  in Poncha Springs. The highways travel concurrently through Poncha Springs.
  in Johnson Village. The highways travel concurrently to Antero Junction.
  in Sheridan and Englewood
  in Denver

See also

References

External links

Endpoints of US highway 285
Map index for photos taken along the entire length of US 285

 
85-2